Frente a Frente is the second album by Mexican actress and pop singer Lucía Méndez. It was released in 1976.

Track listing
 Frente a frente (Juan Gabriel)
 Hay que saber perder (Abel Domínguez)
 Mi vida está rosa (Fernando Z. Maldonado)
 Perdón si te molesté (Cuco Sánchez)
 No me quieras tanto (Rafael Hernández)
 Tu y la mentira (José Alfredo Jiménez)
 A mi manera (Paul Anka, Claude François, Lucien "Gilles" Thibaut, Jacques Révaux)
 Permiteme volver (Tirzo Paiz)
 Cariño nuevo (José Ángel Espinoza "Ferrusquilla'") 
 Desesperanza (Gonzálo Curiel)

Singles 
Frente a frente (Juan Gabriel) / Mi vida está rosa (Fernando Z. Maldonado)
Hay que saber perder (Abel Domínguez) / Cariño nuevo (José Ángel Espinoza "Ferrusquilla")

Video Clips 
Frente a frente

1976 albums
Lucía Méndez albums